Volleyball competitions at the 2011 Pan American Games in Guadalajara were held from October 15 to October 29 at the Pan American Volleyball Stadium (indoor) and the Pan American Beach Volleyball Stadium (beach) in Puerto Vallarta. Each indoor team was made up of twelve athletes while each beach volleyball team consisted of one pair.

Medal summary

Medal table

Events

Men

The following nations qualified for the men's tournament:

Women

The following nations qualified for the women's tournament:

Indoor Schedule
The competition will be spread out across fifteen days, with the women competing first, followed by the men.

Beach schedule
All times are Central Daylight Time (UTC-5).

See also
 2011 Pan American Games

References

 
Events at the 2011 Pan American Games
2011
Pan American Games